Missabotti is a small town located in the Mid North Coast Region of New South Wales. It had a population of 298 in the 2016 census.

References 

Towns in New South Wales
Mid North Coast
Nambucca Shire